Return to Paradise may refer to:

Film and television
 Return to Paradise (1935 film), a French film directed by Serge de Poligny 
 Return to Paradise (1953 film), an adaptation of James Michener's book (see below), directed by Mark Robson
 Return to Paradise (1998 film), a remake of the 1989 French film Force majeure, directed by Joseph Ruben
 Return to Paradise (TV series), a 2022 Philippine drama romance series

Literature
 Return to Paradise (short story collection), a 1951 novel by James A. Michener
 Return to Paradise, a 1992 book by Breyten Breytenbach

Music
 Return to Paradise (Randy Stonehill album), 1989
 Return to Paradise (Sam Sparro album) or the title song, 2012
 Return to Paradise (Styx album), 1997
 "Return to Paradise", a song by Elton John from A Single Man, 1978
 "Return to Paradise", a song by X-Perience from Lost in Paradise, 2006
 "Return to Paradise", a song written by Dimitri Tiomkin and Ned Washington for the 1953 film